Charles Mensah may refer to:

 Charles Mensah, Gabonese filmmaker, screenwriter and production manager
 Charles Nii Armah Mensah Jr. (Shatta Wale), Ghanaian reggae-dancehall artist
 Charles Mensah (footballer), Ghanaian footballer